The 9th World Championships in Athletics, under the auspices of the International Association of Athletics Federations, were held from 23 August to 31 August 2003 in the Stade de France in  Saint-Denis, Seine-Saint-Denis, France.

Men's results

Track

1999 | 2001 | 2003 | 2005 | 2007

Note: * Indicates athletes who ran in preliminary rounds.
1 Jerome Young of the United States originally finished first in 44.50, but was disqualified after he tested positive for drugs in 2004. 
2 The United States (Calvin Harrison, Tyree Washington, Derrick Brew, Jerome Young) originally finished first in 2:58.88, but were disqualified after Jerome Young and Calvin Harrison both tested positive for drugs in 2004.

Field
1999 | 2001 | 2003 | 2005 | 2007

Women's results

Track
1999 | 2001 | 2003 | 2005 | 2007

Note: * Indicates medalists who ran in preliminary rounds.

Field
1999 | 2001 | 2003 | 2005 | 2007

Medal table

References

For more information about these results including in-depth results of all heats and finals that include photo finish, wind readings and reaction times see the link below.
 IAAF Championship 2003

 
World Athletics Championships
World Championships in Athletics
World Championships in Athletics
International athletics competitions hosted by France
International sports competitions hosted by Paris
Athletics in Paris
World Championships In Athletics
World Championships In Athletics